Marek Smurzyński (1954 – 12 December 2009) was a Polish translator, Persian language speaker and translator, Persian literature expert, and an Iranologist.

Bibliography 
  Smurzyński, Marek. A sententious character of the Persian ghazal as its structural feature. 1987.
  Smurzyński, Marek. Granice jawnego i utajonego w kulturze perskiej. 1988.
  Mahmoody, Betty. O czarnej niewdzięczności szczerego wyznania. Smurzyński Marek. 1992.
  Sepehri, Sohrab. Głosy u brzegu wód. Smurzyński Marek. Łódź: Stowarzyszenie Literackie im. K.K. Baczyńskiego, 1993.
  Dżalaloddin Rumi. W mgnieniu słów. Marek Smurzyński. Wydawnictwo Homini, 2008. .
  Adam-ha ru-ye pol. Wybór poezji Wisławy Szymborskiej. Marek Smurzyński, Shahram Sheydaee, Choka Chakad, Wydawnictwo Nashr-e Markaz, Teheran, (w jęz. perskim). , 1997.

References 
 Farangi, Aydin. "Polish Marek Smurzyński loves Iran: Over the usual borders" Etemaad Newspaper, December 13, 2009, No. 2125, p. 8. available at: http://www.etemaad.ir/Released/88-09-22/253.htm#168351

1954 births
2009 deaths
Polish expatriates in Iran
University of Tehran alumni
Writers from Łódź
Polish translators
Linguists from Poland
University of Warsaw alumni
Academic staff of Jagiellonian University
Polish Muslims
Polish Shia Muslims
20th-century translators
20th-century linguists
Faculty of Letters and Humanities of the University of Tehran alumni